Teeraphol Yoryoei (born 25 October 1994) is a Thai professional footballer who plays as an attacking midfielder, he has also been used as a forward for Thai League 1 club Muangthong United.

References

1994 births
Living people
Teeraphol Yoryoei
Teeraphol Yoryoei
Association football midfielders
Teeraphol Yoryoei
Teeraphol Yoryoei
Teeraphol Yoryoei
Teeraphol Yoryoei